The 2006 Open de Tenis Comunidad Valenciana was an Association of Tennis Professionals men's tennis tournament held in Valencia, Spain that was part of the International Series of the 2005 ATP Tour. It was the 12th edition of the event which was won by unseeded Nicolás Almagro in men's singles and David Škoch and Tomáš Zíb in doubles.

Finals

Singles

 Nicolás Almagro defeated  Gilles Simon, 6–2, 6–3

Doubles

 David Škoch /  Tomáš Zíb defeated  Lukáš Dlouhý /  Pavel Vízner, 6–4, 6–3

References

External links
Association of Tennis Professional (ATP) tournament profile

 

 
Val
Valencia Open
Val
Valenciana